I'm Off is a 1999 novel by the French writer Jean Echenoz. It is also known as I'm Gone. It received the Prix Goncourt.

See also
 1999 in literature
 Contemporary French literature

References

1999 French novels
Novels by Jean Echenoz
Prix Goncourt winning works